Vincent McBride (born 1934 in Stalybridge, Cheshire, England) was a footballer who played in the Football League for Walsall and Mansfield Town.

Vince McBride was associated with Aston Villa for a period of two years without establishing himself in the first team. He had spells with Northwich Victoria, Colwyn Bay and Rhyl before joining Mossley in 1962. McBride successfully limited the young giant of a keeper's Jock Wallace, Jr. appearances for the Ashton United (Hurst F.C) first team; being one of two Football League calibre keepers on the books at the same time.

Later life
Vince McBride went on to teach P.E at West Hill School, where he had been Head Boy in 1949, after his footballing career.
 
He settled in Cheshire after retirement until his death in 2005. A bench at Sandiway Golf Club is set on the 12th hole in his memory.

Sources

External links
Walsall career stats
Mansfield career stats
http://www.friendsreunited.co.uk/this-is-class-4b-in-year-1965-the-year-we-all-left-west-hill-to-join-the-great/Memory/4bc500c1-b946-4311-ba08-b399e046d697
http://www.freewebs.com/aufc/w.htm

English footballers
Stalybridge Celtic F.C. players
Ashton United F.C. players
Walsall F.C. players
Aston Villa F.C. players
Mansfield Town F.C. players
Northwich Victoria F.C. players
Colwyn Bay F.C. players
Rhyl F.C. players
Mossley A.F.C. players
English Football League players
1934 births
People from Stalybridge
2005 deaths
Association football goalkeepers